Semen (Semyon) Fishelevich Gluzman (born 10 September 1946, Kyiv) is a Ukrainian psychiatrist and human rights activist.

He is also the president and founder of the Ukrainian Psychiatric Association, founder of the  American-Ukrainian Bureau for Human Rights, director of the International Medical Rehabilitation Center for the Victims of War and Totalitarian Regimes, a member of the Council of Experts under the Ukraine's Ministry of Labor and Social Policy. He also is co-chairperson of the Babi Yar Committee and former dissident and political prisoner. He holds M.D. qualification.

Biography
His father was doctor of medical sciences Fischel Abramovich Gluzman (1904—1987). In 1968, he graduated from the Kyiv Medical Institute. After graduation, Gluzman started working in Ukrainian psychiatric hospitals and was offered a position at the Dnipropetrovsk Special Psychiatric Hospital in a city not far from the Black Sea.

Semyon Gluzman was the first psychiatrist in the Soviet Union to openly oppose Soviet abuse of psychiatry against dissenters. In 1971, Gluzman wrote an in-absentia psychiatric report on General Petro Grigorenko who spoke against the human rights abuses in the Soviet Union. Gluzman came to the conclusion that Grigorenko was mentally sane and had been taken to mental hospitals for political reasons. In the late 1970s and early 1980s, Gluzman was forced to serve seven years in labor camp and three years in Siberian exile for defending Grigorenko against the charge of insanity. On 28 November 1977, Amnesty International added Gluzman to its list of 92 members of the medical profession who were imprisoned for their political beliefs. While in prison Gluzman and fellow inmate Vladimir Bukovsky jointly wrote A Manual on Psychiatry for Dissidents published in Russian, English, French, Italian, German, Danish.

In the 1980s Gluzman (who is a Jew) turned down offers to migrate to Israel by "people sent from American synagogues" and even Soviet officials.

In 1991, Gluzman founded the Ukrainian Psychiatric Association (UPA) as an independent mouthpiece and created a commission to address grievances about civil rights violations by mental health administrators.

In recognition of his courage and commitment to ethical psychiatry, Gluzman was given the title of a Distinguished Fellow of the American Psychiatry Association and the title of an Honorary Member of the Royal College of Psychiatrists in 1980.

In 2008, Semyon Gluzman was honored with the Geneva Prize for Human Rights in Psychiatry presented to him at the XIV Congress of the World Psychiatric Association in Prague for exceptional courage and adherence to ideals of humanism, for renunciation of using psychiatry against political dissidents as well as for dissemination of ethical principles during the reform of mental health service in Ukraine.

Gluzman coauthored many research papers covering psychiatry in Ukraine, the health consequences of the Chornobyl accident, their risk perceptions, suicide ideation, heavy alcohol use, nicotine dependence, intimate partner aggression.

References

Gluzman's publications

Books on Soviet psychiatry
 
 
  The work in Russian was also published in:  The work in English was published in: 
 
 
 
 
 
 
 

Prose and poetry 
  
 
 

Research papers in English without co-authors
 
 
 
  
 

Research papers in English with co-authors
 
 
 
 
 
 
 
 
 
 
 
 
 
 
 
 
 
 
 

Research papers in Russian without co-authors
 
 
 
 
 
 
 
  The paper was also published in:  
 
 
 

Research papers in Russian with co-authors
  The paper was also published in 
 
 

Research papers in Ukrainian 
 

Articles, reports, interviews, chapters in books
 
 
 
 
 
 
 
 
 
 
 
 

1946 births
Living people
Physicians from Kyiv
Soviet Jews
Ukrainian Jews
Ukrainian psychiatrists
Psychiatry academics
Fellows of the Royal College of Psychiatrists
Soviet dissidents
Ukrainian dissidents
Soviet human rights activists
Ukrainian human rights activists
Writers from Kyiv
Ukrainian writers in Russian
Ukrainian non-fiction writers
Ukrainian medical writers
20th-century Ukrainian writers
21st-century Ukrainian writers
Soviet psychiatric abuse whistleblowers
Soviet prisoners and detainees
Amnesty International prisoners of conscience held by the Soviet Union
Ukrainian prisoners and detainees